Peter Martin (born 10 February 1975) is a Slovak former professional darts player who played in World Darts Federation (WDF) and Professional Darts Corporation (PDC) events. He represented Slovakia at the 2010 PDC World Cup of Darts.

Career
In 2010, Martin represented Slovakia at the 2010 PDC World Cup of Darts, teaming up with Oto Zmelik. They lost 6–3 in the first round of the tournament playing against the Irish pair (Mick McGowan and William O'Connor). They averaged 74.90.

In 2011, he lost to Joe Murnan in the final round of the Romanian Open.

He qualified for the 2013 Austrian Darts Open where he were to play against Mervyn King in the first round. However, Martin withdrew from the event as he couldn't show up in time giving King a walkover.

Martin attended at the PDC Qualifying School in 2011, 2013, 2016 and 2018.

Performance timeline

References

External links
 "Peter Martin Player Profile", Darts Database.
 "Peter Martin", Mastercaller.

1975 births
Living people
Slovak darts players
Professional Darts Corporation associate players
PDC World Cup of Darts Slovak team
Sportspeople from Zvolen